The plants in Middle-earth, the fictional world devised by J. R. R. Tolkien, are a mixture of real plant species with fictional ones. Middle-earth was intended to represent the real world in an imagined past, and in many respects its natural history is realistic.

The botany and ecology of Middle-earth are described in sufficient detail for botanists to have identified its plant communities, ranging from Arctic tundra to hot deserts, with many named plant species, both wild and cultivated.

Scholars such as Walter S. Judd, Dinah Hazell, Tom Shippey, and Matthew T. Dickerson have noted that Tolkien described fictional plants for reasons including his own interest in plants and scenery, to enrich his descriptions of an area with beauty and emotion, to fulfil specific plot needs, to characterise the peoples of Middle-earth, and to establish tangible symbols in his mythology.

Context 

J. R. R. Tolkien intended Middle-earth to represent the real world in an imagined past, thousands of years before the present time. He made clear the  correspondences in latitude between Europe and Middle-earth, establishing the presence of both British and Mediterranean zones:

Tolkien learnt about plants, their history and cultivation from his mother, from his reading, from visiting show gardens, by gardening, and by studying medieval herbals, which taught him about the lore and supposed magical properties of certain plants. He stated that the book that most influenced him as a teenager was C. A. Johns's Flowers of the Field, a flora of the British Isles, which he called his "most treasured volume". He explained that he was intrigued by the diversity of plant forms, as he had a "special fascination ... in the variations and permutations of flowers that are the evident kin of those I know". Among his artworks are a series of paintings of grasses and other plants, often with the names he gave them in Quenya, one of his invented Elvish languages. These could be realistic or, as with his pencil and ink drawing of ranalinque or "moon-grass", stylized, in the manner of Art Nouveau.

Literary functions 

In his Middle-earth writings, Tolkien mentions real plant species, and introduces fictional ones, for a variety of reasons.
Dinah Hazell describes the botany of Middle-earth as being "the best, most palpable example" of Tolkien's realistic subcreation of a secondary world. In her view, this at once serves a "narrative function, provides sense of place, and enlivens characterization", while studying the flora and their associated stories gives the reader a deeper appreciation of Tolkien's skill.

Realism 

Tolkien mentions many plants appropriate to the geographical and climatic zones through which his characters pass, especially in The Lord of the Rings, the accurate plant ecology conveying a strong sense of the reality of Middle-earth. Scholars such as Matthew Dickerson, Jonathan Evans, and Walter S. Judd with Graham Judd, have described the botany and ecology of Middle-earth in some detail, from the agriculture of the Shire to the horticulture of the Elves, the wildwood of the Ents, and the polluted volcanic landscape of Mordor. Walter and Graham Judd have examined the Middle-earth flora and its various plant communities from Arctic tundra to hot deserts, have listed and illustrated the many identifiable plant species from alders to yews, not forgetting cultivated plants from beans to flax, and have provided identification keys to the plants and flowering herbs involved.

The Shire is described as a fertile agricultural region, able to produce not only the food needed by its comfortable population, complete with Gaffer Gamgee's "taters" (potatoes), but cultivated mushrooms, wine such as the delicious Old Winyards, and tobacco. Nearby Bree indeed uses botanical names for many of its people, such as the "doubly botanical" name of the innkeeper Barliman Butterbur, named for barley (the chief ingredient of beer), and the butterbur, a large stout wayside herb of Northwestern Europe. Other plant-based surnames in Bree include Ferny, Goatleaf, Heathertoes, Rushlight, Thistlewool, and Mugwort.

Towards the end of their quest, the hobbit protagonists Frodo and Sam travel through the Mediterranean vegetation of Ithilien, giving Tolkien the opportunity to demonstrate the "breadth of his botany" with convincing details of that region's mild climate and different flora.

Narrative and plot 

Some plants fulfil a specific plot need, such as with athelas, a healing plant that turns out to be the cure for the Black Breath, the chill and paralysis that overcame people who fought against the Ringwraiths, Sauron's most deadly servants. In The Lord of the Rings, Athelas is used only by Aragorn, who becomes King of Gondor, explaining its common name, Kingsfoil. Shippey remarks that Aragorn the healer-king echoes a real English King, Edward the Confessor. Tolkien may have had the Old English Herbarium in mind with the healing herb Kingsfoil: in that text, Kingspear (woodruff) is said to have a distinctive aroma, and to be useful for healing wounds, while the ending in -foil, meaning "leaf", is found in the names of herbs such as cinquefoil.

Sense of place 

One reason was to enrich his descriptions of an area with beauty and emotion, such as with the small white Niphredil flowers and the gigantic Mallorn trees with green and silver leaves in the Elvish stronghold of Lothlórien, symbolising indeed Galadriel's Elves. Similarly, when describing the Island of Númenor, lost beneath the waves before the time of The Lord of the Rings, Tolkien introduces Oiolairë, an evergreen fragrant tree said to be highly esteemed by the people there. Or again, when describing the grave-mounds of the Kings of Rohan, Tolkien mentions Simbelmynë (Old English for "Evermind"), a white Anemone that once grew in Gondolin and that stands for remembrance of the noble and brave Riders of Rohan. David Galbraith of the Royal Botanical Gardens (Ontario) writes that "plants are ... crucial in imagined landscapes", and that few of these are as rich in detail as Tolkien's Middle-earth", where "the plants ranged from simple and familiar to exotic and fantastic".

Characterisation 

Tolkien mentions plant products, too, when he wishes to characterise a people. In the Prologue to The Lord of the Rings, he explains that "pipe-weed", tobacco, is derived from "a strain of the herb Nicotiana", and that the Hobbits of the Shire love to smoke it, unlike the other peoples of Middle-earth. He goes into some detail on this, naming the varieties Longbottom Leaf, Old Toby, and Southern Star, grown in the Shire, and Southlinch from Bree. This has a personal ring, as Tolkien loved to smoke a pipe, and indeed described himself as a Hobbit: "I am in fact a Hobbit (in all but size). I like gardens, trees, and unmechanized farmlands; I smoke a pipe, ... I am fond of mushrooms (out of a field)".

Obsessive interest 

The scholar Patrick Currystates that "Tolkien obviously had a particular affection for flora", especially trees, noting that the birch was his "personal 'totem'". Tom Shippey writes that Tolkien's many mentions of plants reveal a deep and continuous interest:

Identity of man and nature 

Shippey comments that Tolkien's strongest belief, visible as a theme in much of his writing, is the identity of man and nature; he gives multiple examples:

Mythic symbols 

A final reason was to establish tangible symbols in his mythology. Early in the history of Arda, Tolkien introduced the Two Trees of Valinor, enormous magical trees that illuminated the Blessed Realm until their destruction by the first Dark Lord, Morgoth. However, some of the light of the Trees was saved in the Silmarils, central to the mythology of The Silmarillion. In addition, another tree, Galathilion, was created in the image of one of the Two Trees, Telperion. One of its seedlings, named Celeborn, was brought to the island of Tol Eressëa. One of its seedlings was given to the Men of Númenor, and it became Nimloth, the White Tree of Númenor. It was destroyed by the King, Ar-Pharazôn, who had come under Sauron's influence; but the hero Isildur had saved one of its fruits, and when he arrived in Middle-earth from the wreck of Númenor, he planted its seeds; one of these grew into the White Tree of Gondor. When the line of Kings of Gondor failed, the White Tree died, and stood dead in the royal courtyard of the city of Minas Tirith throughout the centuries of rule by the Stewards of Gondor. When Aragorn returned as King, he fittingly found a seedling of the White Tree on the mountain behind the city.

The Tolkien translator and author Stéphanie Loubechine describes the opposing roles of the beneficial birch and the malign willow in Tolkien's tree symbolism, on the view that plants are not simply a green backdrop but consistently carry meaning.

Individuals 

Curry comments that Tolkien's trees are never just symbols, also being individuals in the narrative. He mentions a real-world instance, a "great-limbed poplar tree" that grew by Tolkien's house; when it was "suddenly lopped and mutilated by its owner", he notes that Tolkien described the event as a "barbarous punishment for any crimes it may have been accused of". Within Middle-earth, Curry quotes the Ent or tree-giant Treebeard's account of the traitorous wizard Saruman's destruction in Fangorn Forest: "Curse him, root and branch! many of those trees were my friends, creatures I had known from nut and acorn; many had voices of their own that are lost for ever now. And there are wastes of stump and bramble where once there were singing groves".

In film 

Peter Jackson's film trilogy of The Lord of the Rings set the action largely in the New Zealand landscape. The New Zealand ecologist Robert Vennell writes that this put native and introduced plant species into the films in "an important supporting role". He notes for instance that as Frodo and Sam set out on their quest across the Shire in The Fellowship of the Ring, they are "knee deep" in the invasive species wandering willie, Tradescantia fluminensis, a native of Latin America; it covers the ground, drowning out the native forest undergrowth. Further south, they travel through forests of southern beech, Nothofagus, used for the Elvish forest of Lothlorien, the Entish forest of Fangorn and Amon Hen where the fellowship fight the Uruk-hai. The totara tree appears in the Shire; wilding pines appear in the scene where the Ringwraiths chase Arwen and Frodo. Fictional flowers, too, were created for the films; Vennell writes that the wood anemone-like Simbelmynë of Rohan were made in the Weta Workshop.

References

Primary 
This list identifies each item's location in Tolkien's writings.

Secondary

Sources

External links 

 Tolkien's Plant Passion Moves Botanist To Create Guide To Middle Earth, on National Public Radio

Middle-earth
Fictional plants
Themes of The Lord of the Rings